Highland Avenue is a north–south road in Los Angeles. It is a major thoroughfare that runs from Cahuenga Boulevard and the US 101 Freeway in Hollywood from the north end to Olympic Boulevard in Mid-City Los Angeles on the south end. Highland then is a small residential street  from Olympic Boulevard south to Adams Boulevard. For through access, Highland swerves west into Edgewood Place which accesses La Brea Avenue. 

Highland runs parallel to La Brea Avenue on the west and  Vine Street on the east. The neighborhood east of Highland between Wilshire Boulevard and Melrose Avenue is officially known as Hancock Park.

At the northern end of Highland is the Hollywood Bowl, a major amphitheater and Los Angeles landmark. South of that is the famous intersection of Hollywood and Highland, location of the Hollywood & Highland Center and its Dolby Theatre (venue of the Academy Awards since 2002), and the Hollywood/Highland Metro station for the B Line subway to Downtown and the Valley. 

Half a block further south is the Hollywood Museum, located in the historic Max Factor Building, which houses a collection of items from the history of motion pictures and television.

Hollywood High School, the alma mater for many celebrities, is located on the corner of Sunset Boulevard and Highland.  

Further south, near Beverly Boulevard, Highland is adjacent to the Wilshire Country Club in Hancock Park.  Highland Avenue's median parkway with historic palm trees, between Melrose Avenue and Wilshire Boulevard, was designated a Los Angeles Historic-Cultural Monument in 1972. The Queen palms (Syagrus romanzoffiana) and Mexican fan palms (Washingtonia robusta) were planted in 1928.

For most of its length Highland is four lanes wide, but narrows to two lanes south of Wilshire Boulevard. Metro Local line 656 runs along Highland Avenue from Santa Monica Boulevard north, and on to the Valley.

The segment from the US 101 Freeway south to Santa Monica Boulevard used to be designated as part of California State Route 170. California's legislature has since relinquished state control of that segment, and thus that portion is now maintained by the City of Los Angeles.

Landmarks
Hollywood Bowl
Hollywood High School
 Highland Avenue parkway palms

References

Streets in Los Angeles
Streets in Hollywood, Los Angeles
Los Angeles Historic-Cultural Monuments